A replay review is a form of user-generated content. In most instances, a replay review is a review of an RTS video game game replay of a lesser player by a more experience, talented player. Replay reviews are used to increase the skill of the original player, but are often also read or watched for entertainment. These reviews are done in a multitude of ways. Some replays are written, usually by talented players who can pick out errors made by the original player. Other replay reviews, often called shoutcasts, are spoken reviews, meant to be manually synced with the actual game replay so players can listen to a commentary while watching the game. 

Other review styles are becoming increasingly prevalent. Some video reviews are streamed videos of the games with the audio already being synced up, and are often uploaded on video sharing sites, or privately streamed on review websites.

Games

Replay reviews are often used in games such as Company of Heroes Command & Conquer: Red Alert 3 Battle for Middle Earth 2, Supreme Commander, and Age of Empires 3. Most premier RTS titles with active communities have replay reviews at their cores. Some online websites revolve around these reviews, such as Gamereplays and HeavenGames.

Tales of

Tales of is a review series focusing on high quality replay reviews of the best replays for the video games Company of Heroes and Dawn of War II. The series became prevalent in 2007, with the first iteration being known as Tales of Heroes and was hosted by prominent community members Vitensby and Bridger. More recently, a new series, Tales of War, is a similar series focusing on the game DOW2. The series is hosted by community members Bridger and Camdere.

References

External links 
HeavenGames, a source of RTS replays
Gamereplays, a source of RTS replays

Video game gameplay